Walter Hendley (by 1499 – 1 March 1550), of Cranbrook, Kent and Gray's Inn, London, was an English politician.

Career
Hendley was a Member of Parliament for Canterbury, Kent in 1542.

References

15th-century births
1550 deaths
Politicians from London
People from Cranbrook, Kent
English MPs 1542–1544
Members of Gray's Inn